Béla Zulawszky (Slovak: Vojtech Zulawszky) (23 October 1869 – 24 October 1914) was a Slovak-Hungarian fencer. He won a silver medal in the individual sabre event at the 1908 Summer Olympics. He was killed in action during World War I.

Biography
Béla Zulawszky graduated from university in 1897 and then became a gymnastics teacher at the military academy in Koszeg, Hungary. He was a member of the Magyar Atlétikai Club in Budapest and also taught fencing. Zulawszky competed at both the 1908 and 1912 Olympics in all three weapons, winning silver in individual sabre in 1908. He joined the Hungarian Army in 1912 as an officer, eventually becoming a major. He was killed in Sarajevo in the early days of World War I, in October 1914.

See also
 List of Olympians killed in World War I

References

External links
 

1869 births
1914 deaths
Slovak male épée fencers
Hungarian male épée fencers
Hungarian male foil fencers
Hungarian male sabre fencers
Olympic fencers of Hungary
Fencers
Fencers at the 1908 Summer Olympics
Fencers at the 1912 Summer Olympics
Olympic silver medalists for Slovakia
Olympic silver medalists for Hungary
People from Tokaj
Olympic medalists in fencing
Medalists at the 1908 Summer Olympics
Austro-Hungarian military personnel killed in World War I
Slovak male foil fencers
Slovak male sabre fencers
Sportspeople from Borsod-Abaúj-Zemplén County